Chrysaeglia is a genus of moths in the subfamily Arctiinae. The genus was erected by Arthur Gardiner Butler in 1877.

Species
Chrysaeglia magnifica (Walker, 1862)
Chrysaeglia perpendicularis Cerny, 1995
Chrysaeglia xantha Kishida, 1996

References

External links

Lithosiini
Moth genera